Moniteur may refer to:

 Belgian official journal (Moniteur Belge), the official journal of Belgium
 Le Moniteur Universel, a French newspaper between 1789 and 1901, and at times the official journal of the French government
 Il Monitore Napoletano, gazette of the short-lived Parthenopaean Republic was named in emulation of the above French one
 Le Moniteur des travaux publics et du bâtiment, a French magazine
 Moniteur ottoman
 Le Moniteur (Haiti), gazette of the Republic of Haiti